The 2019 season is Bangkok United Football Club's 11th in the new era since they took over from Bangkok University Football Club in 2009. It is the 4th season in the Thai League and the club's 9th (7th consecutive) season in the top flight of the Thai football league system since returning in the 2013 season.

Squad

League by seasons

Transfer

Pre-season transfer

In

Out

Retained

Return from loan

Mid-season transfer

In

Out

Friendlies

Pre-Season Friendly

Mid-Season Friendly

Competitions

Overview

Thai League

League table

Results summary

Results by matchday

Matches

FA Cup

League Cup

AFC Champions League

Qualifying play-off

Statistics

Appearances and goals

|-
! colspan="16" style="background:#dcdcdc; text-align:center"| Goalkeepers

	
|-
! colspan="16" style="background:#dcdcdc; text-align:center"| Defenders

|-
! colspan="16" style="background:#dcdcdc; text-align:center"| Midfielders

|-
! colspan="16" style="background:#dcdcdc; text-align:center"| Forwards

|-
! colspan="16" style="background:#dcdcdc; text-align:center"| Players transferred out during the season

Top scorers
{| class="wikitable" style="text-align:center;width:75%;"
|-
! Rank
! No.
! Pos.
! Player
! Thai League
! FA Cup
! League Cup
! Champions League
! Total
|-
| 1
| 11
| FW
|align=left|  Nelson Bonilla
||16||1||0||0||17
|-
| 2
| 8
| MF
|align=left|  Vander
||6||1||0||0||7
|-
| rowspan=3| 3
| 3
| DF
|align=left|  Everton
||3||1||1||0||5
|-
| 29
| MF
|align=left|  Sanrawat Dechmitr
||4||0||1||0||5
|-
| 27
| MF
|align=left|  Anon Amornlerdsak
||5||0||0||0||5
|-
| rowspan=1| 4
| 9
| FW
|align=left|  Mike Havenaar
||3||0||1||0||4
|-
| rowspan=6| 5
| 18
| MF
|align=left|  Alexander Sieghart
||0||2||1||0||3
|-
| 14
| FW
|align=left|  Teeratep Winothai
||2||0||1||0||3
|-
| 10
| MF
|align=left|  Pokklaw Anan
||3||0||0||0||3
|-
| 22
| FW
|align=left|  Jaycee John
||0||3||0||0||3
|-
| 97
| FW
|align=left|  Guntapon Keereeleang
||1||2||0||0||3
|-
| 7
| DF
|align=left|  Tristan Do
||3||0||0||0||3
|-
| rowspan=3| 6
| 30
| FW
|align=left|  Robson
||0||2||0||0||2
|-
| 20
| FW
|align=left|  Chananan Pombuppha
||2||0||0||0||2
|-
| 37
| MF
|align=left|  Wisarut Imura
||2||0||0||0||2
|-
| rowspan=2| 7
| 28
| MF
|align=left|  Thossawat Limwannasathian
||1||0||0||0||1
|-
| 31
| DF
|align=left|  Peerapat Notchaiya
||1||0||0||0||1
|-
|- class="sortbottom"
|colspan=4|Own goals
|3
|0
|0
|0
|3
|-
!colspan=4|Totals
!55
!12
!5
!0
!72
|-

Clean sheets
{| class="wikitable" style="text-align:center;width:75%;"
|-
! Rank
! No.
! Pos.
! Player
! Thai League
! FA Cup
! League Cup
! Champions League
! Total
|-
| 1
| 1
| GK
|align=left|  Michael Falkesgaard
||7||3||0||0||0|10
|-
| 2
| 34
| GK
|align=left|  Warut Mekmusik
||1||1||0||0||0|2
|-
!colspan=4|Totals
!8
!4
!0
!0
!12
|-

Disciplinary record

Awards

Monthly awards

References

BKU
2019